John-Jason "JJ" Peterka (born 14 January 2002) is a German professional ice hockey center currently playing for the  Buffalo Sabres of the National Hockey League (NHL). He was drafted 34th overall by the Sabres in the 2020 NHL Entry Draft.

Playing career
Peterka made his professional debut with  EHC Red Bull München of the Deutsche Eishockey Liga (DEL). During the 2019-2020 season he appeared in 42 games scoring 7 goals and 4 assists for 11 points. Following this season JJ Peterka was drafted in the second round of the 2020 NHL draft 34th overall by the Buffalo Sabres JJ Peterka was projected to be a first round pick before the draft, but fell to the Buffalo Sabres in the second round. He was said to be a great skater with great hands and great ability to make plays at top speed, while drawing a comparison to Patrick Kane. He was also said to be an unrelenting player meaning he never gives up on the puck. Following the draft JJ went back to the DEL and played 30 games while scoring 9 goals and 11 assists for 20 points in the 2020-2021 season.

On 12 June 2021, Peterka was signed by the Buffalo Sabres to a three-year, entry-level contract. During the 2021-2022 season JJ Peterka played for the Rochester Americans which is the AHL team for the Buffalo Sabres. Here he appeared in 70 games during his rookie season scoring 28 goals and 40 assists for a total of 68 points. He also played in 10 playoff games that year recording 7 goals and 5 assists for 12 points.

Peterka made his NHL debut with the Sabres on December 29, 2021, in a game against the New Jersey Devils. After the game, the Sabres returned him to the American Hockey League's Rochester Americans.

His first career NHL goal came in the Sabres' 2022–23 season opener at home against the Ottawa Senators. Peterka's goal tied the game at 1–1 en route to a Buffalo 4–1 victory on October 13, 2022.

Career statistics

Regular season and playoffs

International

Awards and honors

References

External links
 

2002 births
Living people
Buffalo Sabres draft picks
Buffalo Sabres players
EHC München players
Sportspeople from Munich
Rochester Americans players
EC Red Bull Salzburg players
German ice hockey centres